Gale Henry (April 15, 1893 – June 17, 1972) was an American film actress. A prominent comedian, she appeared in more than 230 films between 1914 and 1933.

In 1923, Gale Henry and her husband, Henry East, began training dogs for motion pictures. Spread over two acres on the outer edge of Hollywood, the East kennels trained the most celebrated dog stars in the movies, including Skippy, the terrier who reached stardom as Asta in The Thin Man.

In 1920, Henry owned a film production company that had a contract with Special Pictures Corporation calling for her to make 12 two-reel comedies per year.

Partial filmography

 Twelve "Lady Baffles and Detective Duck" short subjects, with Max Asher, produced by Pat Powers, 1915
 The Hunch (1921)
 Quincy Adams Sawyer (1922)
 Night Life in Hollywood (1922)
 Held to Answer (1923)
 Changing Husbands (1924)
 The Fire Patrol (1924)
 Merton of the Movies (1924)
 Open All Night (1924)
 Along Came Ruth (1924)
 New Lives for Old (1925)
 Youth's Gamble (1925)
 Declassee (1925)
 Mighty Like a Moose (1926 short)
 Two-Time Mama (1927)
 Love 'em and Weep (1927)
 Stranded (1927)
 The Love Doctor (1929)
 Darkened Rooms (1929)

References

External links

Gale Henry  at Women Film Pioneers Project

1893 births
1972 deaths
American film actresses
American silent film actresses
Silent film comedians
Dog trainers
People from Alpine County, California
20th-century American actresses
20th-century American comedians
Comedians from California